The Master of the Antiphonal Q of San Giorgio Maggiore was an Italian painter of illuminated manuscripts active in the northern region, especially around Venice and possibly around Verona, between 1440 and 1470.  His name is derived from a choir book decorated for the Benedictine monks of San Giorgio Maggiore in that city.  Stylistically, he appears to have been aware of the work of Pisanello.  His miniatures are highly naturalistic, although bound by formal and decorative restraints.

References
 Master of the Antiphonal Q of San Giorgio Maggiore at the Getty Museum

15th-century Italian painters
Manuscript illuminators
Antiphonal Q of San Giorgio Maggiore, Master of the
Painters from Verona